Charimachilis is a genus of the family Machilidae which belongs to the insect order Archaeognatha (jumping bristletails). They are found in southern and eastern Europe.

Species

Charimachilis armata Stach, 1958
Charimachilis caucasicus Kaplin, 1999
Charimachilis dentata Wygodzinsky, 1941
Charimachilis manfredoniae Kaplin 2010
Charimachilis orientalis (Silvestri, 1908)
Charimachilis palaestinensis Wygodzinsky, 1939
Charimachilis relicta Janetschek, 1954 (Full: Charimachilis relicta relicta)
Charimachilis relicta egatensis Bach, 1982
Charimachilis relicta insularis Janetschek, 1957
Charimachilis relicta melitensis Stach, 1958
Charimachilis relicta meridionalis Janetschek, 1957
Charimachilis ukraniensis Stach, 1958
Charimachilis wahrmani Wygodzinsky, 1959

References

Archaeognatha
Insects of Europe